Nidi may refer to:
Nidi Sohana
Nidi Yahana Kelabei
Nidi railway station
Niði, see Dwarf (mythology)